Rutland Township is located in LaSalle County, Illinois. As of the 2010 census, its population was 3,698 and it contained 1,627 housing units. Rutland Township changed its name from Trenton Township in May, 1850.

Geography

Demographics

References

External links
US Census
City-data.com
Illinois State Archives

Townships in LaSalle County, Illinois
Populated places established in 1850
Townships in Illinois
1850 establishments in Illinois